Grimesthorpe Bridge railway station was a minor railway station in Sheffield, South Yorkshire, England. The station served the communities of Grimesthorpe and was situated on the Sheffield and Rotherham Railway, lying between Wicker and Brightside.

Grimesthorpe Bridge was the first intermediate station to open on the Sheffield and Rotherham Railway, then not yet part of the Midland Railway. The station, the first to open on the line disappeared from the timetables in January 1843, four and a half years after the line's opening in October 1838.

The station location is now underneath what is known as Grimesthorpe Junction and its complex trackplan. There, the lines from Wicker, Sheffield Midland, Attercliffe Goods station, The Sheffield District Railway and from Rotherham/Barnsley met.

References

Disused railway stations in Sheffield
Railway stations in Great Britain opened in 1838
Railway stations in Great Britain closed in 1843